The first season of the American television situation comedy Leave It to Beaver premiered on October 4, 1957 and concluded on July 16, 1958. It consisted of 39 episodes shot in black-and-white, each running approximately 25 minutes in length. This was the only season that the show originally aired on CBS.

Episodes

References 

 Applebaum, Irwyn. The World According to Beaver. TV Books, 1998. 
 IMDb: Leave It to Beaver. Season 1.
 Leave it to Beaver: Season One. DVD. Universal Studios Home Entertainment, 2005.
 Mathers, Jerry. ...And Jerry Mather as "The Beaver". Berkley Boulevard Books, 1998. .

1